James Lockwood Conger (February 18, 1805 – April 10, 1876) was an American lawyer and politician from the U.S. state of Michigan. From 1851 to 1853, he served one term in the  U.S. House of Representatives as a member of the Whig party.

Biography 
Conger was born in Trenton, New Jersey, and moved with his parents to New York in 1809.  They settled in Canandaigua, New York, where he attended the district schools and studied medicine at Canandaigua Academy.

In 1822, Conger moved to Lancaster, Ohio, where he taught school for several years and studied law.  He was admitted to the bar in 1825 and commenced practice in Lancaster.  He soon moved to Cleveland, Ohio, and continued the practice of law from 1826 to 1836.  Then he moved to Macomb County, Michigan, and laid out the town of Belvidere, Michigan, which was destroyed by flood in 1837. This was at the mouth of the Clinton River in what is today Harrison Township, Michigan.  He soon moved to Mount Clemens, where he was engaged in banking and mercantile endeavors.

Congress 
In 1850, Conger was elected as a Whig from Michigan's 3rd congressional district to the 32nd United States Congress, serving from March 4, 1851 to March 3, 1853. He declined to be a candidate for renomination in 1852 and resumed his former business pursuits.

Retirement and death 
Owing to ill health, James L. Conger retired from active business pursuits.  

He died in St. Clair, Michigan, and was interred in Green Lawn Cemetery in Columbus, Ohio.

References

The Political Graveyard
	

1805 births
1876 deaths
Burials at Green Lawn Cemetery (Columbus, Ohio)
Politicians from Canandaigua, New York
People from Mount Clemens, Michigan
Whig Party members of the United States House of Representatives from Michigan
19th-century American politicians
People from Trenton, New Jersey
People from Lancaster, Ohio
People from Cleveland